Munawar Sultana (8 November 1924 – 15 September 2007) was an Indian cinema actress, who acted in Hindi films. She is cited as one of the "popular" actresses of the late 1940s to early 1950s period, along with Noor Jehan, Swarnalata and Ragini. Her specialty was playing a selfless woman, enduring the rough treatment meted by her husband and family, but who eventually "brought her erring husband back home".

She came into prominence with Mazhar Khan's Pehli Nazar (1945), her first film in a leading role. A discovery of actor-producer-director Mazhar Khan, she became inundated with film offers, becoming one of the busiest actresses by 1949, along with other leading ladies such as Suraiya and Nargis. She starred in films with the leading heroes of the era like Prithviraj Kapoor, Dilip Kumar, Surendra, Motilal, Trilok Kapoor, Mahipal etc. Some of her successful films were Pehli Nazar, Dard (1947), Elaan (1947) Kaneez (1947), and Babul (1950).

Early life
Munawar Sultana was born on 8 November 1924, in Lahore, Punjab, British India, into a strict Punjabi Muslim family. According to an interview with son Sarfaraz and daughter Shaheen, conducted by Shishir Krishna Sharma, Munawwar's father was a radio announcer. Munawwar wanted to become a doctor, but was side-tracked by an offer in films. This was a small role in the film, Dalsukh Pancholi's Khazanchi (1941), where she played a barmaid, and had a song, "Peene Ke Din Aaye" picturised on her. She went by the screen name Asha for this period. According to Patel, Munawwar came to Bombay from Lahore, courtesy of the actor-director Mazhar Khan in 1945. She became popular with her film Pehli Nazar, a role she stated was one of her favourites.

Career
In 1945, she was visited in Lahore by producer-actor-director Mazhar Khan, who contracted her on a monthly fee of Rs. 4000 plus an apartment, and brought her to Bombay. Munawar's first film with Mazhar was Pehli Nazar, where she was cast opposite actor Motilal. In the popular song "Dil Jalta Hai Toh Jalne Do" (Let the Aflame Heart Burn) playbacked by singer Mukesh for Motilal, Khan focused on Munawar's close-ups during the picturisation.

1940s
Following Pehli Nazar, she was kept busy through 1947 to 1949 working in several films. Baburao Patel wrote in the cine-mag Filmindia 1949, about her being one of the most over-worked actresses along with Suraiya and Nargis.

In 1947, Munawar acted in four films Dard, Elaan, Andhon Ki Duniya and Naiyya. Dard was directed by Abdul Rashid Kardar under Kardar Productions. In spite of no big stars being in the film, it turned out to be a surprise "musical hit" at the box office. The hero of the film was Kardar's brother Nusrat (Kardar), while Suraiya played the second lead, with Munawwar Sultana as the main heroine. Munawwar lip-synced three songs voiced for her by Uma Devi, a Naushad discovery. The song "Afsana Likh Rahin Hoon" became a big success. Elaan garnered positive reviews for Munawwar. A Muslim social, the film was praised for its "progressive attitude" towards the need of education. It was directed by Mehboob Khan and had Surendra as the male lead.

1948 saw Munawar in four more films. Parai Aag was produced by Great India Pictures and directed by Najam Naqvi. The film starred Munawar with Madhubala and Ulhas. Sona (Gold) was another Mazhar Khan-directed film for his Mazhar Arts Production. Majboor was a Bombay Talkies production, under the direction of Nazir Ajmeri. It had Shyam opposite Munawwar with music by Ghulam Haider. Bombay Talkies had gone through several changes following Himanshu Rai's death, and Devika Rani's partnership with S. Mukherjee had produced several box office hits. With first, Mukherjee, and then Devika Rani leaving as head of production of Bombay Talkies, Ashok Kumar and S. Vacha returned to Bombay Talkies and took over control. Their first film was Majboor. The story was an "inter-communal" love story, with a Muslim boy falling for a Hindu girl. Munawwar formed a "hit-pairing" with Shyam in this film, while Lata Mangeshkar came into prominence under the music direction of Ghulam Haider. Meri Kahani was directed by cameraman Keki Mistry and produced by Sharaf for Super Team Federal Productions (Bombay). The film co-starred Munawwar and Madhubala with Surendra. A comedy of errors, it has the hero in a double role leading to mistaken identities.

1949 was Munawar's busiest year with seven releases. Dil Ki Duniya was directed by Mazhar Khan for his Noble Arts Production. It co-starred Geeta Bali and Mazhar with Munawar. The film was praised for its "versatility" and "well-balanced production values", along with good performances by Munawwar, Mazhar and Geeta Bali. The film was claimed to have done "well" at the box office. Her standout film that year was Kaneez, directed by Krishna Kumar for Caravan Pictures. A Muslim social, it had Munawwar with Shyam, and Kuldeep Kaur. She played a suffering woman married to a wayward husband, who eventually returns to her. It was described as one of her best roles.

1950s
Out of her four films released in 1950, Munawar's most notable film was Babul (Father's House). She acted opposite Dilip Kumar and Nargis in this love triangle. Directed by S. U. Sunny, the music was composed by Naushad. The film became a major success at the box office. She acted in a few more films till 1956, with Jallad being her last appearance.

Personal life
While working in films, Munawar met Sharif Ali, an affluent businessman who supplied furniture for movie sets. He had financed and produced two films starring Munawar Sultana, namely Meri Kahani (1948) and Pyar Ki Manzil (1950). They got married in 1954, at which point Munawar Sultana quit acting. Her final film, Jallad was released in 1956, but had been completed before she got married. Munawar Sultana eventually had seven children. The family lived in a house on Ambedkar Road in the posh Pali Hill area of Mumbai, where many of Munawar's contemporaries in the film industry also lived. Unfortunately, her husband passed away suddenly in 1966, when the eldest of their seven children was only eleven years old. However, the family was still comfortably off as both Munawar Sultana and her husband had managed to keep their finances in good condition. For the last eight years of her life, she suffered from Alzheimer's disease. She died peacefully at her home on 15 September 2007, at the age of eighty-two.

Filmography
List:

References

External links

1924 births
2007 deaths
Actresses from Lahore
Actresses in Hindi cinema
Actresses from Mumbai
Actresses in Urdu cinema
Punjabi people
20th-century Indian actresses